Marchwacz-Kolonia  is a village in the administrative district of Gmina Szczytniki, within Kalisz County, Greater Poland Voivodeship, in west-central Poland.

References

Marchwacz-Kolonia